The 1912 Maymyo earthquake or Burma earthquake struck Burma on the morning of May 23, with an epicentre near Taunggyi and Pyin Oo Lwin in Shan State. The earthquake was initially calculated at 8.0 on the surface wave magnitude scale by Beno Gutenberg and Charles Francis Richter, and described by them as being one of the most remarkable seismic events in the early 1900s. Recent re-evaluation of the earthquake, however, have revised the magnitude to 7.6–7.9. It was preceded by two foreshocks on May 18 and 21 with respective intensities V and VII on the Rossi–Forel scale, while the mainshock was assigned IX. Shaking was felt throughout most of Burma, parts of Siam and Yunnan; an area covering approximately 375,000 square miles. It was one of the largest earthquakes in the country.

Tectonic setting
Burma is wedged between four tectonic plates; the Indian, Eurasian, Sunda and Burma plates that interact due to active geological processes. Along the west coast of the Coco Islands, off the Rakhine coast, and into Bangladesh, is a highly oblique convergent boundary known as the Sunda megathrust. This large fault marks the boundary between the Indian and Burma plates. The megathrust emerges from the seafloor in Bangladesh, where it runs parallel and east of the Chin Hills. This boundary continues to north of Burma where it ends at the eastern Himalayas.

Destructive earthquakes have rocked this nation for centuries, but very little academic research has been invested to understand their seismological characteristics. Most earthquakes in Burma, including large, surface rupturing events are not well understood. A large  8.5–8.8 earthquake in 1762 ruptured a section of the Sunda Megathrust off the Rakhine coast. That earthquake is thought to be the result of the Indian Plate subducting beneath the Burma Plate along the megathrust. The subduction of the Indian Plate also causes intraslab earthquakes beneath Central Burma. The 1975  7.0 earthquake in Bagan was caused by reverse faulting at an intermediate depth of 120 km.

Earthquake 
Beno Gutenberg and Charles Francis Richter estimated this earthquake at 8.0 on the surface wave magnitude scale in the second edition of their book Seismicity of the Earth and Associated Phenomena published in 1954. Later studies in 1983 and 1992 recalculated the magnitude of the earthquake at 7.6–7.7 . On the moment magnitude scale, the earthquake is estimated to be 7.7–7.8 . Other estimates including one in Richter's 1958 book Elementary Seismology and the journal Secular seismic energy release in the circum-Pacific belt by Seweryn J. Duda presented 7.9 . Further studies and evaluation of the earthquake stated that had the earthquake have a magnitude of 8.0 as stated by Gutenberg and Richter, the Kyaukkyan fault would have ruptured for a length of at least 240 km. Field studies and isoseismal data however inferred that the rupture length was only 140 to 160 km, which corresponds to a 7.6–7.7  earthquake. The International Seismological Centre stated that the moment magnitude was 7.9.

Geology
The earthquake is situated along the Kyaukkyan fault, a 500 km long right-lateral structure running through the Shan plateau. It runs nearly parallel to the more dominant Sagaing Fault. Many left and right-lateral faults are situated in the Shan plateau as a result of the rotating Sunda block. Earthquakes are common in this region including a magnitude 7.7 event in 1988 and the deadly quake of 2011. The earthquake ruptured a 160 km section of the northernmost segment of the Kyaukkyan Fault. Assuming a magnitude of 7.6–7.7, a maximum offset of 8–9 meters was estimated for the event. Other earthquakes have occurred on the same fault in 4660 and 1270 years before present.

Impact 
The number of casualties in this earthquake is not known, but the National Earthquake Information Center catalog stated in the "death description" parameter that "few" deaths occurred with the definition of "few" being around 1–50 deaths.

Pyin Oo Lwin 
Witness reported the sound of thunder during the event. Wooden beams, bricks, and plaster fell from the Governor's House. Two chimneys fell off a station hospital and a roof of a family hospital collapsed. A Baptist church was seen swaying during the earthquake. The seismic intensity probably reached VIII–IX in this area. Many bungalows were damaged and some were unsafe for people. A major rockslide disrupted service on the Burma Railway between Nawnghkio and Hsum-hsai. Surface rupture was visible and a railway track was bent. Landslides occurred in a gorge near Gokteik station, which was also affected. Class A brick masonry buildings suffered serious structural damage corresponding to Grade 4 on the European macroseismic scale (EMS). Numerous landslides were triggered on the nearby mountain ranges and every pagoda in the city was obliterated.

Mandalay 
Many witnesses mentioned difficulties attempting to stand during the event. A cathedral suffered extensive cracking throughout. The Wesleyan School also suffered major damage as a masonry building. Three-quarters of Class A brick buildings and nearly all pagodas and monasteries were damaged. Five buildings suffered total collapse, Grade 5 on the EMS while an additional 31 sustained Grade 4 damage. On the Rossi–Forel scale, the shaking reached IX.

Taunggyi 
The shock lasted more than a minute there, nearly all chimneys had fallen and military buildings were in critical condition.

Mogok 
Shaking created cracks in brick buildings and collapsed several pagodas. Landslides damaged water pipelines and cut off power to the city for two nights.

Other areas 
In places slightly further away from the earthquake such as parts of Shan state, Bago region, Kachin state, Sagaing region, and Kayah state, noises were heard, and shaking intensity ranged between VI–VII (Strong–Very Strong). Some buildings cracked but the shaking was not enough to cause destruction. In Hsipaw, many masonry buildings suffered serious damage, and chimneys collapsed. Liquefaction events took place in many parts.

In northern and southern Burma, Yunnan, and parts of Siam, the shock had become a gentle rocking sensation and was felt by most of the population. The intensity here was IV–V (Light–Moderate). No damage was reported.

In Rangoon and the Chin Hills, the earthquake was barely perceivable. However, the motion was still strong enough that lamps were seen swinging, oil and water in Seikkyi Kanaungto township was seen to sway about. Akyab marked the extreme point where shaking could still be felt, none was observed past the city.

See also 

 List of earthquakes in 1912
 List of earthquakes in Myanmar

References

External links

1912 earthquakes
Earthquakes in Myanmar
1912 in Asia
1912 disasters in Asia
Strike-slip earthquakes
Shan State
1912 in the British Empire